José Agustín "Roberto" Airaldi (4 October 1902 – 8 December 1977) was an Argentine actor.

Selected filmography
The Desire (1944)

References

External links

 

Argentine male film actors
1902 births
1977 deaths